The Joel H. Hubbard House, also known as the Ferson–Butler–Satterlee Home is a historic residence in St. Charles, Illinois. The Greek Revival structure is constructed of wood on a stone foundation with an asphalt roof. It remains structurally similar to its original 1854 design with the exception of a sunroom addition. Joel H. Hubbard was a carpenter who originally designed this house and lived there for at least a year. The next owner was George Ferson, a member of the Kane County Board of Supervisors. It was listed on the National Register of Historic Places on May 4, 2011.

References

Landmark programs help preserve history

Houses completed in 1854
Houses in Kane County, Illinois
Houses on the National Register of Historic Places in Illinois
National Register of Historic Places in Kane County, Illinois
St. Charles, Illinois